This is a list of National Football League (NFL) running backs by total career rushing touchdowns. This list includes all running backs with at least 75.

Emmitt Smith is the all-time leader with 164. He also leads in postseason touchdowns with 19.
Cam Newton is the only quarterback in this list.

Players with at least 75 touchdowns

Through the  season

Players with at least 10 postseason rushing touchdowns

Through end of  playoffs

Historical rushing touchdowns leaders

Fifteen players are recognised as having held outright or tied the record as the NFL's career rushing touchdowns leader. Both Jim Brown and Emmitt Smith have held the record for over 20 years.

See also
NFL records (individual)
List of National Football League career rushing yards leaders
List of National Football League annual rushing touchdowns leaders

References

Career rushing touchdown leaders at profootballreference.com

Rushing
Rushing touchdowns leaders

National Football League lists